is a passenger railway station in located in the town of Asahi, Mie District, Mie Prefecture, Japan, operated by the private railway operator Kintetsu Railway.

Lines
Ise-Asahi Station is served by the Nagoya Line, and is located 27.4 rail kilometers from the starting point of the line at Kintetsu Nagoya Station.

Station layout
The station consists of two opposed side platforms, and is the only station on the Nagoya Line without connection between the platforms.

Platforms

Adjacent stations

History
Ise-Asahi Station opened on January 30, 1929 as a station on the Ise Railway. The Ise Railway became the Sangu Express Electric Railway’s Ise Line on September 15, 1936, and was renamed the Nagoya Line on December 7, 1938. After merging with Osaka Electric Kido on March 15, 1941, the line became the Kansai Express Railway's Nagoya Line. This line was merged with the Nankai Electric Railway on June 1, 1944 to form Kintetsu.

Passenger statistics
In fiscal 2019, the station was used by an average of 2196 passengers daily (boarding passengers only).

Surrounding area
Toshiba Mie Factory
Japan National Route 1

See also
List of railway stations in Japan

References

External links

Kintetsu: Ise-Asahi Station 

Railway stations in Japan opened in 1929
Railway stations in Mie Prefecture
Stations of Kintetsu Railway
Asahi, Mie